Thannhausen is a town in the district of Günzburg, in Bavaria, Germany.

References

Populated places in Günzburg (district)